Antonio de la Torre (born 12 August 1992) is a Guatemalan male professional squash player. He achieved his highest career ranking of 222 on August, 2015 during the 2015 PSA World Tour and is currently ranked 297th during the 2018 PSA World Tour.

References 

1992 births
Living people
Guatemalan male squash players
Sportspeople from Guatemala City
20th-century Guatemalan people
21st-century Guatemalan people